The Drugs and Cosmetics Rules, 1940 are the rules which the government of India established through the Drugs and Cosmetics Act, 1940. These rules classify drugs under given schedules and present guidelines for the storage, sale, display and prescription of each schedule.

Schedules

The Drugs and Cosmetics Rules, 1945 has provisions for classification of drugs under given schedules and there are guidelines for the storage, sale, display and prescription of each schedule. The Rule 67 details the conditions of licenses. The Rule 97 contains the labeling regulations.

The notable Schedules and their summary:

 Schedule G: Most of these drugs are hormonal preparations. The drug label must display the text "Caution: It is dangerous to take this preparation except under medical supervision" prominently. Examples of substances under this schedule: Testolactone, Hydroxyurea, Carbutamide, Primidone etc.
 Schedule H: The drug label must display the texts "Rx" and "Schedule H drug. Warning : "Not to be sold by Retail without the prescription of a Registered Medical Practitioner" prominently. It can only be supplied to licensed parties. It cannot be sold without a prescription and only the amount specified in the prescription should be sold. The time and date of prescription must be noted. Examples: androgenic, anabolic, oestrogenic and progestational substances; Alprazolam (Xanax), Hepatitis B vaccine, Ibuprofen, Vasopressin etc.
 If a Schedule H drug also comes under the purview of Narcotic Drugs and Psychotropic Substances Act, 1985, it must carry the texts "NRx" and "Schedule H drug. Warning: To be sold by retail on the prescription of a Registered Medical Practitioner only." on the label prominently.
 Schedule X: All the regulations of Schedule H apply. The retailer must keep a copy of the prescription for two years. The drugs must be kept under lock and key. Examples: Secobarbital, Glutethimide etc.
 Schedule J: Contains a list of various diseases and conditions that cannot be treated under any drug currently in market. No drug may legally claim to treat these diseases.

Other Schedules and their summary:

 Schedule A:  Contains various forms and formats of letters for applications of licensing etc.
 Schedule B:  Contains fees structure for government-run labs.
 Schedule C:  Contains various biological products and their regulation. Examples: Serums, Adrenaline Vitamins etc.
 Schedule D: List of drugs exempted from the provision of import of drugs
 Schedule E:  Contains various poisons and their regulation. Examples: Sarpa Visha (Snake venom), Parada (Mercury) etc.
 Schedule F: This contains regulations and standards for running a blood bank. 
 Schedule F-I: This contains regulations and standards for vaccines. 
 Schedule F-II: This contains regulations and standards for surgical dressing. 
 Schedule F-III: This contains regulations and standards for umbilical tapes.
 Schedule F-F: This contains regulations and standards for ophthalmic ointments and solutions.
 Schedule K: Contains various substances and drugs and their corresponding regulation.
 Schedule M: Contains various regulations for manufacturing, premises, waste disposal and equipment.
 Schedule N:  Contains various regulations and requirements for a pharmacy.
 Schedule O: Contains various regulations and requirements for disinfectant fluids.
 Schedule P: Contains regulations regarding life period and storage of various drugs.
 Schedule P-I: Contains regulations regarding retail package size of various drugs.
 Schedule Q: Contains a list of permitted dyes and pigments in soap and cosmetics.
 Schedule R: Contains various regulations and requirements for condoms and other mechanical contraceptives.
 Schedule S: Lists various cosmetics and toiletries, and directs the manufacturers of cosmetics to conform to the latest Bureau of Indian Standards requirements.
 Schedule T: Contains various regulations and requirements for manufacture of Ayurvedic, Siddha and Unani products.
 Schedule U: Contains various regulations and requirements for record keeping.
 Schedule V: Contains standards for drugpatents
 Schedule W: Contains Generic Drugs List.

 Schedule Y: Contains requirement and guidelines for clinical trials.

See also
 Drug policy of India
 Drugs and Cosmetics Act, 1940
 Drugs and Magic Remedies (Objectionable Advertisements) Act, 1954

References

Further reading
 
 A Review on the Current Classification and Regulatory Provisions for Medicines in Drug & Cosmetic Act, in the light of Present Day Context Recommendations for Drugs & Cosmetics Rules with context of Drug Schedules

Acts of the Parliament of India 1945
1945 in India
Drug control law in India